Puerto Rico Highway 591 (PR-591) is tertiary highway in Ponce, Puerto Rico. The road is located at the El Tuque sector of Barrio Canas.

Major intersections

See also

 List of highways in Ponce, Puerto Rico
 List of highways numbered 591

References

External links

 Guía de Carreteras Principales, Expresos y Autopistas 

591
Roads in Ponce, Puerto Rico